"Before I Knew Better" is a debut song recorded by American country music artist Brad Martin.  It was released in February 2002 as the first single from his debut album Wings of a Honky-Tonk Angel.  The song was written by David Lee and Bryan Simpson.

Music video
The music video was directed by Shaun Silva and premiered in March 2002. It was filmed in the Holly Desert in Palmdale, California.

Chart performance
"Before I Knew Better" debuted at number 46 on the U.S. Billboard Hot Country Singles & Tracks chart for the week of February 16, 2002.

Year-end charts

References

2002 debut singles
2002 songs
Brad Martin songs
Music videos directed by Shaun Silva
Songs written by David Lee (songwriter)
Songs written by Bryan Simpson
Song recordings produced by Billy Joe Walker Jr.
Epic Records singles